Maká is a Matacoan language spoken in Paraguay by the Maká people.  Its 1,500 speakers live primarily in Presidente Hayes Department near the Río Negro, as well as in and around Asunción.

Phonology

Velar consonants alternate with palatal consonants before /e/ and sometimes before /a/.  Examples include  ~  "autumn" and  ~  "stork".  The palatal approximant /j/ is realised as a palatal fricative [ç] before /i/, as in  ~ .

Syllables in Maká may be of types V, VC, CV, CCV, and CCVC.  When a consonant cluster appears at the beginning of a syllable, the second consonant must be /x/, /h/, /w/, or /j/.

Morphology

Nouns

Gender
Maká has two genders—masculine and feminine.  The demonstratives reflect the gender of a noun (Gerzenstein 1995:153:

In the plural the gender distinction is neutralized, and the plural demonstrative is the same as the feminine singular:

Number

Maká nouns inflect for plurality.  There are several distinct plural endings: -l, -wi, Vts, and -Vy.  All plants take the -wi plural, but otherwise the choice seems to be unpredictable (Gerzenstein 1995:150):

Case
Maká does not have any overt case marking on nouns.  Consider the following sentence, where neither the subject nor object shows any case (Gerzenstein 1995:139):

Agreement with the possessor

Nouns agree with their possessor in person (Gerzenstein 1995:148):

Verbs

Agreement with subject and object
Verbs agree with their subject and object in a rather complex system.  Gerzenstein (1995) identifies five conjugation classes for intransitive verbs.  The following two examples show intransitive verbs from conjugation classes 1 and 3.

Transitive verbs belong to a different conjugation class, Conjugation 6.  The following forms show a transitive verb with a 3rd person object:

If the object of the transitive verb is 1st or 2nd person, then certain combinations of subject and object are shown by a portmanteau morpheme.

Other combinations involve an object agreement marker which may either precede or follow the subject marker (Gerzenstein 1995:94-101):

Applicatives
Verbs in Maká have a series of suffixes called 'postpositions' in Gerzenstein (1995), which have the effect of introducing new oblique objects into the sentence.

The following examples show the applicative suffixes -ex 'instrumental ('with')' and -m 'benefactive ('for')'

Syntax

Noun phrases

In noun phrases, the possessor precedes the possessed noun (Gerzenstein 1995:155):

Noun phrases show the order (Demonstrative) (Numeral) (Adjective) N (Gerzenstein 1995:154):

Sentences

Affirmative
The basic word order for a transitive clause in Maká is subject–verb–object, as seen in the following example (Gerzenstein 1995:138)

For intransitive clauses, the basic order is verb-subject (Gerzenstein 1995:106):

Interrogative

In yes-no questions, the usual subject–verb–object order changes to verb-subject-object following an initial particle /me/ (Gerzenstein 1995:136):

Sentences with wh-questions show a sentence-initial question word. Maká has a very small inventory of question words, with only three members: łek 'who, what', pan 'which, where, how many', and inhats'ek 'why'. The following example shows an interrogative sentence with an initial question word (Gerzenstein 1995:178:

References

External links 
 Argentinian Languages Collection of Ana Gerzenstein, containing audio recordings of Maká, from the Archive of the Indigenous Languages of Latin America.
Maca (Intercontinental Dictionary Series)

Languages of Paraguay
Matacoan languages
Chaco linguistic area